Günther Werner Hans Ramin (15 October 1898 – 27 February 1956) was an influential German organist, conductor, composer and pedagogue in the first half of the 20th century.

Ramin, the son of a pastor, was born in Karlsruhe, Germany. At the age of 12 he was accepted into the famed Thomanerchor of the Thomaskirche in Leipzig by the then-cantor, Gustav Schreck. At the time, Karl Straube, the organist, conductor, publisher and advocate of the music of Max Reger, was Schreck's assistant, and he took note of Ramin's abilities as an organist and composer. Later, when Straube took over the cantorate at the Thomaskirche, Ramin became his assistant, filling in for him as choirmaster and director.

During World War I, Ramin was drafted into military service; however, he managed to complete his examinations at the Leipzig Conservatory with distinction in January 1917 and on 30 May 1918, Straube was able to write to him on the front that he had been chosen as organist of the Thomaskirche. Ramin returned from the war and took up this position, which he held for twenty-two years until World War II broke out.

Ramin built a successful performing career as a concert organist; however, in the 1930s he increasingly devoted himself to conducting. He took over the directorship of the :de:Lehrergesangsverein in Leipzig in 1923 and worked regularly with the choir of the Gewandhaus. In 1935 he became the conductor of the Philharmonic Choir Berlin :de:Berlin Philharmonischer Chor. He was the organist at the 1936 Nuremberg rally, playing on a specially constructed organ, the largest in Germany at the time.  On New Year's Day 1940, Ramin was appointed the cantor of the Thomanerchor at the Thomaskirche, succeeding Karl Straube, a post he held until his death. After this appointment, Ramin devoted himself to performing the choral works of J. S. Bach, earning for himself and the choir international acclaim through two concert tours to Russia (1953) and South America (1955). The year after this last tour, Ramin suffered a sudden brain hemorrhage and died on 27 February 1956.

Some of Ramin's recordings have been re-released on compact disc. Notable among them is his much admired (although severely abridged) 1941 version of Bach's St Matthew Passion, including as soloists Karl Erb, Tiana Lemnitz, and Gerhard Hüsch. He was also active as an organ teacher. Among his notable students were Christoph Albrecht, Karl Richter, Hanns-Martin Schneidt and Helmut Walcha.

References 

Mundus, Doris: 27 February 1956. Thomaskantor in schwieriger Zeit—Günther Ramin. Found in, Leipziger historischer Kalender 2006. Lehmstedt Verlag, Leipzig 2005

1898 births
1956 deaths
German organists
German male organists
Bach conductors
German male conductors (music)
Thomaskantors
20th-century German conductors (music)
20th-century German male musicians
20th-century German composers